The European Softball Women Division B Championship is a minor championship tournament between national women softball teams in Europe, governed by the European Softball Federation.

The winner of this tournament will qualify for the next Division A Championship.

Results

Medal table

See also
European Baseball Championship

External links
European Softball Federation

References

Softball competitions
Softball in Europe